Ferruccio Baffa Trasci (27 August 1590 – 30 October 1656) was an Italian bishop, theologian and philosopher.

Life
Born Ferrante Marco Antonio Baffa Trasci in one of the most noble and wealthy families of the Arbëreshë world in Bisignano, he was the son of Pietro Antonio Baffa Trasci and Elisabetta Anna Trentacapilli. After his teens he moved to Rome and Naples when, as a priest, became one of the most close confessors and confidents of Isabella della Rovere, Princesse of Bisignano, member of the Sanseverino family.

Last years
After many years spent in the Castle Proceno in a voluntary exile, in 1656 he came back to Rome and was created Bishop of Maximianopolis (in partibus infidelium) by Pope Alexander VII.
S.E.R. Ferruccio Baffa Trasci died in Rome the same year in the Great bubonic Plague. 
His bones were buried several years later in Proceno the church of S. Martin.

Works
 Universam Aristotelis philosophiam
 Summa Aristotelicha
 Summa Theologica Dogmatica

See also
Catholic Church in Italy

Notes

1590 births
1656 deaths
Italian Roman Catholic titular bishops
Italian people of Arbëreshë descent
17th-century Italian Roman Catholic bishops
People from the Province of Cosenza